2428392, Inc. (doing business as FYE, the initials for For Your Entertainment) is an American chain of entertainment retail stores headquartered in Albany, New York. Formerly owned by Trans World Entertainment, it began in 1993 and was expanded in 2001, 2006, and again in 2009 after buying out and rebranding mall-based stores Camelot, Sam Goody, Spec's Music, Strawberries, Record Town, Coconuts, DiscJockey, Saturday Matinee, The Wall, Suncoast Motion Picture Company, Musicland and Media Play, His Master's Voice stores. There are 206 locations as of May 2019. As of 2023, FYE is a unit of 2428392, Inc. and retained its headquarters.

History

The first FYE store opened in 1993 at the Trumbull Mall in Trumbull, Connecticut. A second opened in 1995 at Eastview Mall in Victor, New York, and a third at Colonie Center in Colonie, New York in 1997.

In 2001, Trans World unified its other mall-based stores under the "f.y.e." name after buying out Camelot Music. During that year, a major re-branding campaign made f.y.e. the brand name for all of Trans World Entertainment's mall-based retail stores as well as many freestanding locations, though some freestanding or strip mall stores continued to operate under regional brands like Planet Music. In 2016 the company changed the store and website branding to "FYE".

In 2006, Trans World began remodeling buildings that were former Coconut stores and Media Play outlets near Salt Lake City, Utah and Buffalo, New York into FYE superstores. In 2009 FYE closed over 100 locations and 52 more in 2012.

2016 saw Trans World opening new FYE concept stores in multiple locations (such as the Rockaway Townsquare in Rockaway, New Jersey), with a new logo and look, a larger focus on pop-culture related items, an expanded selection of vinyl records and modern turntables, while the selection of Blu-rays, DVDs and CDs has been reduced.

In March 2017, FYE founder and CEO Bob Higgins died. Higgins was responsible for the creating the FYE brand as well as maintaining its profitability and therefore its status as the last remaining music chain store.

In November 2018, FYE's parent company was accused in federal court of deceiving customers by asking them to sign up for "free" and/or "loyalty" membership programs and magazine subscriptions while charging their credit and debit cards $11.99 per month until customers cancelled the services. Another allegation was that customer information was shared with marketing company Synapse without customer consent.

In 2018, 33 FYE stores were closed, and 35 more were scheduled to be closed before the end of Trans World's fiscal year on February 2, 2019.

In 2020, Sunrise Records announced and later finalized their purchase of FYE from TWEC.

Nameplates 
Though the majority of chains acquired by parent company Trans World Entertainment were completely converted into FYE stores (many of which have since closed), a few chains have had a handful of stores kept open, though otherwise being stocked and operated the same as a traditional FYE except for the nameplate. These are:

 Coconut's: Evansville, Indiana
 Sam Goody: St. Clairsville, Ohio and Medford, Oregon 
 Suncoast Motion Picture Company: Beaumont, Texas, Omaha, Nebraska, and Jacksonville, North Carolina

See also
Suncoast Motion Picture Company
Sam Goody 
Camelot
Spec's Music 
Musicland 
Media Play

References

External links

Music retailers of the United States
American companies established in 1993
Retail companies established in 1993
2020 mergers and acquisitions
Companies based in Albany, New York
1993 establishments in Connecticut
American subsidiaries of foreign companies